"The Magic Friend" is a song by Belgian/Dutch Eurodance band 2 Unlimited. It was released in August 1992 as the fourth and final single from their debut album, Get Ready! (1992). The UK release once again omitted Ray Slijngaard's rap, which lasted for 16 bars three times through, but did include some of the vocals from Anita Doth, with the "mocking chorus echoes" being abandoned as only Ray's part remains, thus leaving Anita's sole vocals as "disembodied whispers" during the middle eight. The single experienced chart success in many European countries, including Finland, where it topped the chart. The Dutch leading afternoon radio program on national pop outlet Radio 3 FM/Hilversum renamed itself "The Magic Friend", after the single.

Critical reception
Larry Flick from Billboard wrote, "One of the more successful techno acts in Europe continues its bid for mainstream club and radio approval along these shores with a cute and NRGetic wriggler. The music is a bit harder than previous tracks, though the rap is a little too strained and silly for its own good." Kat Stevens of Freaky Trigger noted the track's "tasty ingredients" of "recogniseable pop stars, colourful boshing beats, catchy chorus, silly noises [and] fervoured anticipation." Comparing parts of the track to settings on a Yamaha keyboard, she compared the track's main synth sound to the "Brass 1" setting and the "gutteral metallic swinging" to the "Slap Bass" setting. James Hamilton from Music Weeks RM Dance Update deemed it as "'Start-Rite' techno for young "wannabe" ravers". Tom Doyle from Smash Hits stated that "the insufferable duo return with another ropey techno effort".

Chart performance
"The Magic Friend" was a major hit on the charts on several continents. In Europe, it peaked at number-one in Finland. It made it to the top 10 also in Belgium, Ireland (number three), the Netherlands (number three), Spain and on MTV's European Top 20. In the United Kingdom, the single reached number eleven in its third week at the UK Singles Chart, on 23 August 1992. On the UK Dance Singles Chart, "The Magic Friend" was an even bigger hit, reaching number nine. Additionally, it was a top 20 hit in Germany, as well as on the Eurochart Hot 100 and a top 30 hit in Sweden. Outside Europe, the single hit number-one on the RPM Dance/Urban chart and number 26 on the RPM Top Singles chart in Canada, number five in Zimbabwe and number 16 in Australia.

Music video
The accompanying music video for "The Magic Friend" was directed by British director David Betteridge. It was shot in The Pinnacles and Wave Rock in Australia. Ray and Anita sing the song in the video while a mysterious character dances around in the background. Selina Webb from Music Week complimented "the slightly surreal" video, adding that it is "in particular standing head and shoulders above the average dance video." Betteridge also directed the videos for "Get Ready for This", "Twilight Zone" and "Workaholic". "The Magic Friend" was later published on 2 Unlimited's official YouTube channel in July 2014. By September 2020, it had more than 222,000 views.

Track listings

 7-inch single "The Magic Friend" (vocal edit) (3:43)
 "The Magic Friend" (instrumental edit) (3:02)

 12-inch maxi "The Magic Friend" (Automatic remix) (4:23)
 "The Magic Friend" (Rio & Le Jean mix) (5:15)
 "Automatic Megamix" (4:55)
 "Murphy's Megamix" (5:40)

 CD single, Belgium "The Magic Friend" (vocal edit) (3:43)
 "The Magic Friend" (instrumental edit) (3:02)
 "The Magic Friend" (extended version) (5:14)
 "The Magic Friend" (Rio & Le Jean remix) (5:15)
 "The Magic Friend" (Automatic remix) (4:23)
 "Murphy's Megamix" (5:40)
 "Automatic Megamix" (4:55)

 CD single, UK "The Magic Friend" (7-inch edit) (3:02)
 "The Magic Friend" (Automatic remix) (4:23)
 "The Magic Friend" (Rio & Le Jean remix) (5:15)
 "Automatic Megamix" (4:55)

 CD maxi, Germany'
 "The Magic Friend" (vocal edit) (3:43)
 "The Magic Friend" (instrumental edit) (3:02)
 "The Magic Friend" (extended) (5:14)
 "The Magic Friend" (Rio & Le Jean remix) (5:05)
 "Murphy's Megamix" (5:40)
 "Automatic Megamix" (4:55)

Charts

Weekly charts

Year-end charts

References

1992 singles
2 Unlimited songs
Number-one singles in Finland
Pete Waterman Entertainment singles
1992 songs
Songs written by Ray Slijngaard
Byte Records singles
ZYX Music singles
Music videos directed by David Betteridge